Cleng Peerson (17 May 1783 – 16 December 1865) was a Norwegian emigrant to the United States; his voyage in 1824 was the precursor for the boat load of 52 Norwegian emigrants in the following year. That boat load was a precursor for the main wave of Norwegian immigration to the United States.

He was a Norwegian-American pioneer who led the first group of Norwegians to emigrate to the United States, traveling on the Norwegian sloop Restauration.

Background
Cleng Peerson was born Klein Pedersen near the community of Tysvær in the county of Rogaland, Norway. His parents were Peder Larsson (1755–1841) and Inger Sjursdotter (1744–1814). Cleng Peerson  grew up on the farm Hesthammar in Tysvær, but was born on the farm Lervik in the same district. In 1821, he first traveled to the United States at the request of a religious community in Stavanger. This community was made up principally of Quakers, together with Haugeans, both groups having been influenced by the beliefs of German Rappites.

Immigration
In 1824, when Peerson came back to Norway, it was decided that a group should emigrate. Peerson returned to America to prepare for their arrival. Cleng Peerson met the immigrants when they landed in New York on October 9, 1825. The road that ran through this settlement is today known as Norway Road.

In 1834, Cleng Peerson led a group of settlers to a little settlement on the Illinois River, in the Fox River Valley. The community of Norway in  LaSalle County, Illinois is the site of the Norwegian Settlers Memorial which was dedicated in 1934.

Starting in 1838, Peerson returned to Norway several times. By 1840, Peerson had settled in Sugar Creek in Montrose Township, Lee County in the southeastern part of Iowa. Cleng Peerson was listed in the United States census records as a settler in 1840. He lived here for several years, including the period 1840–47. In 1847, he joined the Swedish immigrant society at Bishop Hill Colony in Henry County, Illinois, which had been founded by sect leader Erik Janson.

During 1854, the Texas State Legislature granted Peerson  of land west of Clifton, in Bosque County, Texas. Peerson lived here until his death in 1865 and was buried in the cemetery by Our Savior's Lutheran Church in Cranfills Gap.

Personal life
Peerson married the Swedish-born widow Ane Cathrine Saelinger (1749–1831) in 1807. He later married Maria Charlotta Dahlgren (1809 – ca. 1849) who had emigrated from Sweden in 1846.

Legacy
In 1947 and 1975, Cleng Peerson was featured on Norwegian postage stamps.
During 1982, King Olav V of Norway visited Texas in recognition of the 200th anniversary of the birth of Cleng Peerson.
Cleng Peerson Research Library and Cleng Peerson Institute are both located in Clifton, Texas.
Tysvær municipality has announced plans for the Cleng Peerson Center.

In literature 
The True Saga Of Cleng Peerson are novels written by Alfred Hauge  (translated by John Weinstock and Turid Sverre. foreword by Carl W. W. Sorenson. Special Projects Committee, Norwegian Society of Texas; 1982) about the life and times of Cleng Peerson. The three volume series were published in Norwegian between 1961 and 1965 by Gyldendal Norsk Forlag.

References

Other sources
De Pellis, Mario S. Cleng Peerson and the Cummunitarian Background of Norwegian Immigration (Norwegian-American Historical Association. Volume 2I: Page 136) 
Lovell, Odd S. (2015) Across the Deep Blue Sea: The Saga of Early Norwegian Immigrants (Minnesota Historical Society Press)

External links
 The Sloopers - Pioneers in Norwegian Emigration. Norway-Heritage
The Sloopers. Norwegian Emigration Center
Scandinavian Settlement in Bosque County, Texas
Cleng Peerson Research Library
Cleng Peerson Cabin at C P Farm
Sons of Norway Cleng Peerson Lodge

1783 births
1865 deaths
People from Tysvær
Norwegian emigrants to the United States
People from Bosque County, Texas